Péter Farkas (born 14 August 1968) is a Hungarian wrestler and Olympic champion in Greco-Roman wrestling.

Olympics
Farkas competed at the 1992 Summer Olympics in Barcelona where he received a gold medal in Greco-Roman wrestling, the middleweight class.

Criminal conviction
On 10 December 2009 he was convicted in absentia to seven years imprisonment for growing marijuana. At the time of the bust in 2004, his was the largest  operation ever recorded in the country. He was thought to be hiding in Thailand on counterfeit documents, but was ultimately arrested in Andorra. He was sentenced to 7 years in prison. He was released in August 2014.

Stemming from his case, the rules of Hungarian Olympic medalists' lifetime annuity were changed to require keeping a clean criminal record, and Farkas was stripped of his.

References

External links
 

Olympic wrestlers of Hungary
Wrestlers at the 1992 Summer Olympics
Wrestlers at the 1996 Summer Olympics
Hungarian male sport wrestlers
Olympic gold medalists for Hungary
Living people
1968 births
Olympic medalists in wrestling
Medalists at the 1992 Summer Olympics
European Wrestling Championships medalists
World Wrestling Championships medalists
20th-century Hungarian people
21st-century Hungarian people